The Swiss Figure Skating Championships (officially named  and ) are a figure skating competition held annually to crown the national champions of Switzerland. Medals may be awarded in the disciplines of men's singles, ladies' singles, pair skating, and ice dancing, although not every discipline has been held in every year due to a lack of participants.

Senior medalists

Men

Ladies

Pairs

Ice dancing

Junior medalists

Men

Ladies

Ice dancing

References

Sources
 Journal "Eis- und Rollsport", Nr. 7, 18 February 1937, Germany

External links
 Swiss Ice Skating
 Swiss champions at Swiss Skating 
 Guide to Swiss ice skating rinks on Hello Switzerland

Dead links:
 2006–2007 season
 2007–2008 season ; 2007–2008 season 
 2009–2010 season

 
Figure skating national championships
Figure skating in Switzerland
Figure Skating